The 1973–74 Ohio Bobcats men's basketball team represented Ohio University as a member of the Mid-American Conference in the college basketball season of 1973–74. The team was coached by Jim Snyder, in his 25th and final season at Ohio, and played their home games at Convocation Center. The Bobcats finished with a record of 16–11 and won MAC regular season title with a conference record of 9–3. They received a bid to the NCAA Tournament. There they lost to Marquette in the First Round.

Schedule

|-
!colspan=9 style=| Regular Season

|-
!colspan=9 style=| NCAA Tournament

Source:

Statistics

Team Statistics
Final 1973–74 Statistics

Source

Player statistics

Source

References

Ohio Bobcats men's basketball seasons
Ohio
Ohio
Ohio Bobcats men's basketball
Ohio Bobcats men's basketball